The 1997 Baltic Cup football competition took place from 9 to 11 July 1997 at the Žalgiris Stadium in Vilnius, Lithuania. It was the seventh annual competition of the three Baltic states – Latvia, Lithuania and Estonia – since they regained their independence from the Soviet Union in 1991.

Results

Lithuania vs Estonia

Estonia vs Latvia

Lithuania vs Latvia

Final table

Winners

Statistics

Goalscorers

See also
Balkan Cup
Nordic Football Championship

References

External links
RSSSF
RSSSF Details
omnitel

Baltic Cup (football)
Baltic Cup
Baltic Cup
Baltic Cup
International association football competitions hosted by Lithuania